The 1973 Syracuse Orangemen football team represented Syracuse University during the 1973 NCAA Division I football season. The team was led by head coach Ben Schwartzwalder, in his 25th and final year with the team, and played their home games at Archbold Stadium in Syracuse, New York. The team finished with a record of 2–9. At the conclusion of the season, Ben Schwartzwalder retired as Syracuse's all-time winningest coach with an overall record of 153–91–3.

Schedule

References

Syracuse
Syracuse Orange football seasons
Syracuse Orangemen football